Several vessels have been named Miranda:

 was launched in Bristol in 1828. In 1829–1830 she made one voyage to Bengal, sailing under a licence from the British East India Company (EIC). On her return she became a West Indiaman, sailing to Jamaica and Antigua. She was broken up around 1851.
 was launched in Liverpool in 1829 as a West Indiaman. She was condemned at Calcutta in 1840.

See also
 – any one of three vessels of the Royal Navy

Ship names